Icon is a compilation album by American hip hop artist Ice Cube. Consisting of songs from previous albums such as AmeriKKKa's Most Wanted, The Predator, War & Peace Vol. 1 (The War Disc), War & Peace Vol. 2 (The Peace Disc), Lethal Injection, and Death Certificate, it contains classic hits including "It Was a Good Day", "Steady Mobbin'", and "Check Yo Self". The collection, which includes 11 songs, is essentially a repackaged version of Ice Cube's 10 Great Songs album with the addition of "What Can I Do?" Released in 2013, the album grossed 50,000 sales globally according to Statistic Brain. Although the number of sales doesn't compete with some of his earlier work, the popularity of many of the tracks propelled this collection to critical acclaim.

Track listing

References

Ice Cube albums
2013 compilation albums